This List of mountains and hills in Lower Saxony shows a selection of high or well-known mountains and hills in the German state of Lower Saxony (in order of height). Although there is no universally agreed definition of a 'mountain', summits at 2.000 feet (610 metres) or higher may generally be referred to as mountains; those below 2.000 feet as 'hills', hence the division of this list. By this definition, it can be seen that all the mountains in Lower Saxony occur in the Harz.

Highest points in Lower Saxony's regions 
The following table lists the highest points in the various landscapes (hill ranges or regions) of Lower Saxony.

In the "Landscape" column, major hill ranges are shown in bold. Clicking "List" in the rows of the "List" column links to other hills or mountains in that landscape – some of which are outside Lower Saxony.  The table is arranged by height, but may be sorted by other criteria by clicking the symbol of the desired column.

Mountains (2000 feet or higher) 

Name, Height in metres above NN, Location (District/Region); three "???" mean unknown or not yet discovered; please contribute!

 Wurmberg, Goslar district, Harz
 Bruchberg (927 m), Goslar district, Harz
 Achtermannshöhe (926 m), Goslar district, Harz
 Rehberg (893 m), Goslar district, Harz
 Quitschenberg (882 m), Goslar district, Harz
 Auf dem Acker (860 m), Osterode am Harz district, Harz
 Großer Sonnenberg (853.4 m), Goslar district, Harz
 Kleiner Sonnenberg (853.0 m), Goslar district, Harz
 Großer Breitenberg (811 m), Osterode am Harz district, Harz
 Lärchenkopf (801 m), Goslar district, Harz
 Schalke (762 m), Goslar district, Harz
 Abbenstein (756m), Goslar district, Harz
 Haspelkopf (749 m), Goslar district, Harz
 Kuppe (729 m), Goslar district, Harz
 Bocksberg (727 m), Goslar district, Harz
 Kahler Berg (727 m), Goslar district, Harz
 Jordanshöhe (723 m), Goslar district, Harz
 Stöberhai (720 m), Osterode am Harz district, Harz
 Kleiner Breitenberg (711 m), Osterode am Harz district, Harz
 Großer Knollen (688 m), Osterode am Harz district, Harz
 Aschentalshalbe (685 m), Osterode am Harz district, Harz
 Koboltstaler Köpfe (673 m), Goslar district, Harz
 Wolfskopf (669 m), Goslar district, Harz
 Ravensberg (659 m), Osterode am Harz district, Harz
 Beerberg (658 m), Goslar district, Harz
 Übelsberg (651.3 m), Osterode am Harz district, Harz
 Braakberg (646 m), Osterode am Harz district, Harz
 Mathias-Schmidt-Berg (645 m), Goslar district, Harz
 Rammelsberg (635 m), Goslar district, Harz
 Kleiner Knollen (631 m), Osterode am Harz district, Harz
 Großer Wurzelnberg (625.8 m), Osterode am Harz district, Harz
 Hasselkopf, (612 m), Goslar district, Harz
 Kleiner Wurzelnberg (610 m), Osterode am Harz district, Harz

Hills (under 2000 feet) 
 Großer Trogtaler Berg (609 m), Goslar district, Harz
 Langfast, Goslar district, Harz
 Schadenbeeksköpfe (605 m), Osterode am Harz district, Harz
 Adlersberg (593.2 m), Osterode am Harz district, Harz
 Höxterberg (584 m), Osterode am Harz district, Harz
 Gropenbornskopf (581.2 m), Osterode am Harz district, Harz
 Haferberg (581 m), Göttingen district, Kaufungen Forest
 Breitentalskopf (579.1 m), Osterode am Harz district, Harz
 Iberg (563 m), Osterode am Harz district, Harz
 Franzosenkopf (562 m), Osterode am Harz district, Harz
 Kloppstert (553 m), Osterode am Harz district, Harz
 Eichelnkopf (545.7 m), Osterode am Harz district, Harz
 Pagelsburg (545 m), Osterode am Harz district, Harz
 Großer Steinberg (542 m), Göttingen district, Kaufungen Forest
 Kleiner Steinberg (Kaufungen Forest) (542 m), Göttingen district, Kaufungen Forest
 Großer Mittelberg (Lonau) (531 m), Osterode am Harz district, Harz
 Große Blöße (527.8 m), Northeim district, Solling
 Fissenkenkopf (527 m), Osterode am Harz district, Harz
 Großer Ahrensberg (524.9 m), Holzminden district, Solling
 Steile Wand (518.9 m), Osterode am Harz district, Harz
 Moosberg (513.0 m), Holzminden district, Solling
 Häringsnase (508 m), Göttingen district, Kaufungen Forest
 Vogelherd (ca. 505 m), Holzminden district, Solling
 Köterberg (496 m), Holzminden district, Weser Uplands
 Dreiberg (495.5 m), Northeim district, Solling
 Großer Steinberg (493 m), Northeim district, Solling
 Großer Teichtalskopf (492 m), Osterode am Harz district, Harz
 Tünnekenbornstrang (490.1 m), Northeim district, Solling
 Großer Burgberg (482 m), Goslar district, Harz
 Bloße Zelle (480 m), Duingen, Hildesheim district / Grünenplan, Holzminden district, Hils
 Brunsberg (480 m), Göttingen district, Dransfeld State Forest (c.f. Hoher Hagen)
 Bärenkopf (473.0 m), Holzminden district, Solling
 Heuer (472 m), Osterode am Harz district, Harz
 Wolfsstrang (468.7 m), Northeim district, Solling
 Hengelsberg (463 m), Göttingen district, Dransfeld State Forest
 Brackenberg (461.0 m), Göttingen district, Münden Nature Park
 Ebersnacken (460.4 m), Holzminden district, Vogler
 Schönenberg (457.1 m), Northeim district, Solling
 Hasselberg (also called Schrodhalbe; 452.5 m), Holzminden district, Solling
 Hahnenbreite (452.0 m), Northeim district, Solling
 Alte Schmacht (447.5 m), Northeim district, Solling
 Eisernstieg (446.3 m), Northeim district, Solling
 Holzberg (444.5 m), Holzminden district, Holzberg
 Strutberg (444 m), Northeim district, Solling
 Großer Lauenberg (442.6 m), Northeim district, Solling
 Klippen (441.3 m), Holzminden district, Holzberg
 Kanstein (441 m), Hameln-Pyrmont district, Thüster Berg
 Wildenkiel (ca. 441 m), Holzminden district, Solling
 Kohlhai (440.8 m), Holzminden district, Vogler
 Auerhahnkopf (ca. 440 m), Holzminden district, Solling
 Lauensteiner Kopf (439 m), Hameln-Pyrmont district, Ith
 Hohe Egge (437 m), Hameln-Pyrmont district, Süntel
 Schnippkopf (437.0 m), Holzminden district, Vogler
 Kleiner Burgberg (436 m), Goslar district, Harz
 Hammershüttenkopf (430.5 m; western peak), Holzminden district, Vogler
 Mackenröder Spitze (427.5 m), Göttingen district, Göttingen Forest
 Hengstrücken (424 m), Northeim district, Solling
 Hünstollen (423.7 m), Göttingen district, Göttingen Forest
 Dransberg (422 m), Göttingen district, Dransfeld State Forest
 Buchholz (421.7 m), Holzminden district, Solling
 Schotsberg (419 m), Göttingen district, Dransfeld State Forest
 Fast (419 m), Hameln-Pyrmont district, Osterwald
 Sonnenköpfe (414.6 m; western peak), Holzminden district, Solling
 Hammershüttenkopf (412.5 m; eastern peak), Holzminden district, Vogler
 Westlicher Voglerkamm (412 m), Holzminden district, Vogler
 Sackberg (411.4 m), Northeim district, Ahlsburg
 Helleberg (410 m), Holzminden district, Elfas
 Totenberg (408 m), Göttingen district, Bramwald
 Sonnenköpfe (407.0 m; Ostgipfel), Holzminden district, Solling
 Ahrensberg (405 m), Holzminden district, Elfas
 Netteberg (406.1 m), Goslar district, Harz
 Bröhn (405.0 m), Hanover region, Deister
 Großer Homburg (ca. 403 m), Holzminden district, Homburg Forest
 Butterberg (402.0 m), Holzminden district, Vogler
 Himbeerbrink (400.5 m), Holzminden district, Vogler
 Till (399.2 m), Holzminden district, Homburg Forest
 Kohlenberg (396.7 m), Holzminden district, Homburg Forest
 Hohe Tafel (395 m), Hildesheim district, Sieben Berge
 Höfeler (395.2 m), Hanover region, Deister
 Belzer Berg (392.2 m), Northeim district, Amtsberge
 Junge Schmacht (388.0 m), Northeim district, Solling
 Kneppelberg (386 m), Holzminden district, Elfas
 Reinekensiekskopf (382.1 m), Hanover region, Deister
 Sandberg (382 m), Göttingen district, Bramwald
 Klagesberg (381 m), Göttingen district, Bramwald
 Vaaker Berg (380 m), Göttingen district, Bramwald
 Platte (379.7 m), ??? district, Solling
 Hohe Warte (378.5 m), Hanover region, Deister
 Grasberg (378.2 m), Hameln-Pyrmont district / Hanover region, Nesselberg
 Fahrenbrink (375.7 m), Hanover region, Deister
 Belzer Berg (375.6 m), Northeim district, Amtsberge
 Hoher Nacken (375 m), Hameln-Pyrmont district, Süntel
 Mangel (374.9 m), Hanover region
 Bakeder Berg (373 m), Hameln-Pyrmont district, Süntel
 Klingenberg (373 m), Göttingen district, Bramwald
 Schierenbrink (372.3 m), Hanover region / Hameln-Pyrmont district, Nesselberg
 Ochsenberg (371.5 m), Northeim district, Ahlsburg
 Ehrberg (370.5 m), Holzminden district, Vogler
 Hatop (370.4 m), Northeim district, Amtsberge
 Görtsberg (370 m), Holzminden district, Vogler
 Stadtberg (369.2 m), Holzminden district, Homburg Forest
 Diebische Ecke (367 m), Schaumburg district, Bückeberg
 Birkenberg (366 m), Holzminden district, Elfas
 Streitberg (366.0 m), Holzminden district, Vogler
 Sommerberg (364.5 m), ??? district, Solling
 Hörzen (364 m), Hildesheim district, Sieben Berge
 Lehmbrink (364.0 m), Holzminden district, Vogler
 Nesselberg (362 m), Hildesheim district, Sieben Berge
 Großer Hals (361 m), Hanover region, Deister
 Ostenberg (360 m), Hildesheim district, Sieben Berge
 Ducksteinberg (360 m), Northeim district, Ahlsburg
 Vorwohler Berg (360 m), Holzminden district, Elfas
 Griesberg (359 m), Hildesheim district, Hildesheim Forest
 Eichfast (355.7 m), Northeim district, Ahlsburg
 Ebersberg (355.0 m), Hanover region, Deister
 Bützeberg (352.6 m), Holzminden district, Vogler
 Katzennase (352 m), Hameln-Pyrmont district, Süntel
 Hoher Kamp (350 m), Hameln-Pyrmont district, Süntel
 Teichklippe (up to 350 m), Northeim district, Amtsberge
 Großer Schweineberg (349.8 m), Holzminden district, Vogler
 Wolfsberg (347.3 m), Holzminden district, Homburg Forest
 Wolfsköpfe (345.7 m), Hanover region, Kleiner Deister
 Hübichenstein (345 m), Osterode am Harz district, Harz
 Piepenberg (344.9 m), Holzminden district, Vogler
 Bielstein (344 m), Hanover region, Deister
 Wendeberg (343.6 m), Northeim district, Amtsberge
 Kellberg (343.1 m; with observation tower), Holzminden district, Homburg Forest
 Bückeberg (342 m), Schaumburg district, Bückeberg
 Hohenstein (341 m), Hameln-Pyrmont district, Süntel
 Bösenberg (339 m), Hildesheim district, Hildesheim Forest
 Egge (339 m), ??? district, Deister
 Lauensberg (333 m), Hildesheim district, Sieben Berge
 Kleperberg (332 m), Göttingen district, Göttingen Forest
 Flintenburg (331.5 m), Holzminden district, Vogler
 Dörenberg (331.2 m), Osnabrück district, Teutoburg Forest
 Egge (339 m), Hanover region, Deister
 Südwehe (338 m), Hameln-Pyrmont district, Süntel
 Babenstein (331), Hildesheim district, Duinger Berg
 Breitenkamper Berg (326.9 m), Holzminden district, Vogler
 Möncheberg (326 m), Schaumburg district, Wesergebirge
 Roter Stein (325 m), Hameln-Pyrmont district, Süntel
 Eilumer Horn (323.3 m), Wolfenbüttel district, Elm
 Südlieth (323.2 m), Northeim district, Ahlsburg
 Steinberg "1" (323 m), Hildesheim district, Hildesheim Forest
 Drakenberg (321.0 m), Hanover region, Kleiner Deister
 Heimkenberg (320.4 m), Northeim district, Amtsberge
 Amelungsberg (320 m), Hameln-Pyrmont district, Süntel
 Tosmarberg (320 m), Hildesheim district, Hildesheim Forest
 Heidelberg (319.3 m), Holzminden district, Homburg Forest
 Kikedal (319 m), Hildesheim district, Duinger Berg
 Hohe Dehne (317.6 m), Hildesheim district, Heber
 Hammersteinshöhe (317 m), Hildesheim district, Sauberge
 Hainberg (Göttingen Forest) (315 m), Göttingen district, Göttingen Forest
 Kniebrink (315 m), ??? district, Wiehengebirge
 Hirtenberg (314.1 m), Holzminden district, Vogler
 Grafensundern (314 m), Osnabrück district, Teutoburg Forest
 Mechtshäuser Berg (313.5 m), Goslar district, Heber
 Drachenberg (313 m), Wolfenbüttel district, Elm
 Saalberg (313 m), Hildesheim district, Sieben Berge
 Klei (312.9 m), Northeim district, Heber
 Burgberg (312 m), Wolfenbüttel district, Elm
 Kniggenbrink (312 m), Hanover region, Deister
 Lohberg (312 m), Göttingen district, Dransfeld State Forest
 Rosenberg (311 m), Hildesheim district, Hildesheim Forest
 Schiffberg (311.0 m), Holzminden district, Homburg Forest
 Wisselberg (310 m), Holzminden district, Vogler
 Kalenberg (310 m), Hanover region, Deister
 Zimmerberg (309.0 m), Holzminden district, Vogler
 Weidenberg (308.7 m), Northeim district, Ahlsburg
 Butterberg (308 m), Goslar district, Harz
 Himmelberg (308 m), Hildesheim district, Sieben Berge
 Bärenkopf (307 m), Goslar district, Salzgitter Hills
 Hankenüll (307 m), Osnabrück district, on the border of Lower Saxony and North Rhine-Westphalia, Teutoburg Forest
 Hammberg (306 m), Hildesheim district, Hildesheim Forest
 Ramsnacken (305 m), Hameln-Pyrmont district, Süntel
 Iberg (303.0 m), Northeim district, Ahlsburg
 Querberg (303 m), Hildesheim district, Hildesheim Forest
 Weinberg (302.4 m; near Holenberg), Holzminden district, Vogler
 Großer Karl (301 m), Schaumburg district, Bückeberg
 Nußberg (301 m), Hildesheim district, Sieben Berge
 Borberg (300 m), Hameln-Pyrmont district, Süntel
 Schrabstein (300 m), Hameln-Pyrmont district, Süntel
 Kalter Buschkopf (299 m), Wolfenbüttel district, Hainberg
 Kurzeberg (299 m), Holzminden district, Elfas
 Riesenberg (298 m), Hameln-Pyrmont district, Süntel
 Klagesberg (298.2 m), Northeim district, Ahlsburg
 ???-Berg (298.0 m; with Grubenhagen Castle), Northeim district, Ahlsburg
 Böllenberg (297 m), Northeim district, Ahlsburg
 Iberg (295 m), Hameln-Pyrmont district, Süntel
 Mittelberg (294 m), Hameln-Pyrmont district, Süntel
 Turmberg (293 m), Hildesheim district, Bünte
 Vorberg (289 m), Northeim district, Ahlsburg
 Werderberg (288.1 m), Holzminden district, Vogler
 Langer Kopf (288 m), Hildesheim district, Hildesheim Forest
 Hasselnberg (286 m), Hameln-Pyrmont district, Süntel
 Raher Berg (285.1 m), Hanover region, Kleiner Deister
 Schlahköpfe (285 m), Wolfenbüttel district, Hainberg
 Steinberg (max. 283 m), Wolfenbüttel district, Hainberg
 Welfenhöhe (282 m), Hildesheim district, Hildesheim Forest
 Himckeburg (280.2 m), Holzminden district, Vogler
 Pferdeberg (279 m), Göttingen district, Untereichsfeld
 Eimer Berg (278 m), Holzminden district, Elfas
 Schweineberg (278 m), Hameln-Pyrmont district, Wesergebirge
 Süllberg (277 m), Hildesheim district, Hildesheim Forest
 Sonnenberg (276 m), Hildesheim district, Hildesheim Forest
 Hamberg (275 m), Stadt Salzgitter, (Salzgitter Hills)
 Wohlberg (273 m), Hildesheim district, Hildesheim Forest
 Rothenberg (270 m), Northeim district, Amtsberge
 Großer Freeden (269 m), Osnabrück district, Teutoburg Forest
 Heisennacken (267 m), Holzminden district, Elfas
 Schierenberg (267 m), Hildesheim district, Hildesheim Forest
 Auf dem Herze (266 m), Hildesheim district, Hildesheim Forest
 Ebersberg (266 m), Hildesheim district, Sauberge
 Feldberg (266 m), Hildesheim district, Bünte
 Eichenberg (263 m), Hildesheim district, Hildesheim Forest
 Hohlenberg (263 m), Wolfenbüttel district, Hainberg
 Triesberg (261 m), Hildesheim district, Hildesheim Forest
 Osterberg (260 m), Hameln-Pyrmont district, Süntel
 Rottberg (259 m), Hildesheim district, Hildesheim Forest
 Wedeberg (258 m), ??? district, Teutoburg Forest
 Salzberg (257 m), Hildesheim district, Sauberge
 Ziegenberg (257 m), Hildesheim district, Sauberge
 Harlyberg (256 m), Goslar district, Harly Forest
 Buchberg (255 m), Hildesheim district, Weinberg
 Königszinne (255.0 m), Holzminden district, Vogler
 Adlershorst (254 m), town of Salzgitter, Lichtenberge (Salzgitter Hills)
 Hülsberg (254 m), ??? district, Teutoburg Forest
 Kliebenkopf (254 m), Wolfenbüttel district, Hainberg
 Timmer Egge (254 m), ??? district, Teutoburg Forest
 Laubberg (253 m), Goslar district, Hainberg
 Dröhnenberg (252 m), Hildesheim district, Hildesheim Forest
 Jägerturmsköpfe (max. 251 m), Wolfenbüttel district, Hainberg
 Hinterberg (249 m), Hildesheim district, Hildesheim Forest
 Westerberg (249 m), Hameln-Pyrmont district, Süntel
 Haiberg (248 m), Hildesheim district, Hildesheim Forest
 Brandberg (247 m), Hildesheim district, Hildesheim Forest
 Westeregge (245 m), Schaumburg district, Süntel
 Klusberg (244 m), Hildesheim district, Hildesheim Forest
 Nördlicher Jägertumskopf (244 m), Wolfenbüttel district, Hainberg
 Spannbrink (244 m), ??? district, Teutoburg Forest
 Weißer Stein (244 m), Hildesheim district, Sauberge
 Heeßer Berg (243 m), Schaumburg district, Bückeberg
 Hohes Rad (243 m), Hameln-Pyrmont district, Süntel
 Knebelberg (243 m), Hildesheim district, Vorholz
 Lerchenberg (243 m), Hildesheim district, Hildesheim Forest
 Sieben Köpfe (243 m), town of Salzgitter, Lichtenberge (Salzgitter Hills)
 Hamberg (242 m), Hildesheim district, Hildesheim Forest
 Steinberg "2" (242 m), Hildesheim district, Hildesheim Forest
 Hohnsberg (241.9 m) Osnabrück district, Teutoburg Forest
 Burgberg (241 m), town of Salzgitter, Lichtenberge (Salzgitter Hills)
 Linkkopf (241 m), Hildesheim district, Hildesheim Forest
 Katenstein (240.7 m), Northeim district, Ahlsburg
 Steinberg (239 m), Schaumburg district, Bückeberg
 Herzberg (237 m), town of Salzgitter, Lichtenberge (Salzgitter Hills)
 Kneppelberg (236 m), Hildesheim district, Hildesheim Forest
 Sothenberg (235 m), Hildesheim district, Sauberge
 Osterklippe (235 m), Goslar district, Hainberg
 Remlinger Herse (234 m), Wolfenbüttel district, Asse
 Kappenberg (233 m), Holzminden district, Vogler
 Langer Berg (230 m), town of Salzgitter, Lichtenberge (Salzgitter Hills)
 Eichenberg (230 m), Hildesheim district, Hainberg
 Barenberg (227 m), Hildesheim district, Vorholz
 Stuckenberg (227 m), Hildesheim district, Hildesheim Forest
 Hüggel (226 m), Osnabrück district, Teutoburg Forest
 Papenberg (226 m), Hildesheim district, Hainberg
 Röhrberg (225 m), Wolfenbüttel district, Asse
 Borgberg (225 m), ??? district, Teutoburg Forest
 Elber Berg (225 m), Wolfenbüttel district, Lichtenberge (Salzgitter Hills)
 Kahlberg (224.7 m), Northeim district, Solling
 Hillenberg (224 m), Hildesheim district, Hainberg
 Langenberg (224 m), Hildesheim district, Hainberg
 Festberg (223 m), Wolfenbüttel district, Asse
 Hinterer Eichberg (222 m), Wolfenbüttel district, Asse
 Spitzer Hai (222 m), Wolfenbüttel district, Hainberg
 Wendgeberg (222 m), Hameln-Pyrmont district, Süntel
 Rothenberg (221 m), Wolfenbüttel district, Asse
 Heidelbeerenberg (221 m), Hildesheim district, Vorholz
 Weinberg (220.5 m; near Rühle), Holzminden district, Vogler
 Beutling (220 m), Osnabrück district, Teutoburg Forest
 Kalkrosenberg (220 m), town of Salzgitter, Lichtenberge (Salzgitter Hills)
 Lindenberg (219 m), town of Salzgitter, Lichtenberge (Salzgitter Hills)
 Wohldenberg (218 m), ??? district, Hainberg
 Ziegenberg (218 m), Hildesheim district, Hildesheim Forest
 Langer Berg (216 m), Hildesheim district, Vorholz
 Oheberg (215 m), Hildesheim district, Sauberge
 Großer Steinberg (213 m), Hildesheim district, Vorholz
 Urberg (213 m), Osnabrück district, Bad Iburg, Teutoburg Forest
 Mühlberg (212 m), Göttingen district, Bramwald
 Kapitelhai (209 m), Wolfenbüttel district, Hainberg
 Wenser Berg (209 m), Hildesheim district, Vorholz
 Kleiner Berg (208 m), Osnabrück district, Teutoburg Forest
 Kanzelberg (207 m), Hildesheim district, Bünte
 Klingenberg (207 m), Hildesheim district, Hildesheim Forest
 Spitzhut (207 m), Hildesheim district, Vorholz
 Langenberg (206 m), Osnabrück district, Teutoburg Forest
 Hützlah (206 m), ??? district, Hainberg
 Hungerberg (205 m), Wolfenbüttel district, Oderwald
 Mittlerer Eichberg (201 m), Wolfenbüttel district, Asse
 Emilienhöhe (201 m), Hildesheim district, Hildesheim Forest
 Großer Steinkuhlenberg (201 m), town of Salzgitter, Lichtenberge (Salzgitter Hills)
 Ilsenberg (201 m), Hildesheim district, Vorholz
 Mieckenberg (200 m), Hildesheim district, Vorholz
 Kleiner Freeden (200 m), Osnabrück district, Teutoburg Forest
 Süllberg (198.2 m), Hanover region, Calenberg Land
 Strutzberg (198 m), Schaumburg district, Deister
 Kleiner Steinkuhlenberg (195 m), town of Salzgitter, Lichtenberge (Salzgitter Hills)
 Limberg (194.3 m), Osnabrück district, Teutoburg Forest
 Born (192 m), Osnabrück district, Wiehen Hills
 Bockernberg (190 m), town of Salzgitter, Lichtenberge (Salzgitter Hills)
 Silberberg (180 m), Osnabrück district, Hüggel region
 Kleiner Steinberg (175 m), Hildesheim district, Vorholz
 Thieberg (175 m), Hildesheim district, Vorholz
 Benther Berg (173 m), Hanover region, Calenberg Land
 Schulenburger Berg (173 m), Hanover region
 Großer Hahnenberg (172 m), Wolfenbüttel district, Asse
 Wilseder Berg (169 m), Soltau-Fallingbostel district, Lüneburg Heath
 Rehberg (165 m), Hildesheim district, Vorholz
 Brunnenberg (161 m), Nienburg/Weser district, Rehburg Hills
 Münchhausener Berg (160 m), Schaumburg district, Bückeberg
 Kalkrieser Berg (157 m), Osnabrück district, Wiehen HIlls
 Ortsberg (157 m), Hildesheim district, Vorholz
 Öselberg (156 m), Wolfenbüttel district, Ösel
 Burgberg (155 m), Hanover region, Gehrdener Berg
 Hülsenberg (155 m), Harburg district, Harburg Hills
 Heisterberg (153 m), Schaumburg district, Bückeberg
 Wolfsberg (152.1 m), Hanover region, Calenberg Land
 Falkenberg (150 m), Celle district, Lüneburg Heath
 Gannaberg (150 m), Harburg district, Harburg Hills
 Schleptruper Egge (148 m), Bramsche district, Wiehen Hills
 Vörier Berg (147.6 m), Hanover region, Calenberg Land
 Signalberg (146 m), Vechta district, Damme Hills
 Mordkuhlenberg (145 m), Vechta district, Damme Hills
 Süerser Berg (143 m), Hanover region, Gehrdener Berg
 Hoher Mechtin (142 m), Lüchow-Dannenberg district, Elbufer-Drawehn Nature Park, Drawehn
 Lauseberg (141.0 m), Hanover region, Deister
 Pampower Berg (140 m), Lüchow-Dannenberg district, Elbufer-Drawehn Nature Park
 Trillenberg (140 m), Osnabrück district, Ankum Heights
 Hagenberg (136.2 m), Osnabrück district, Teutoburg Forest
 Köthenerberg (139 m), Hanover region, Gehrdener Berg
 Brunsberg (129 m), Harburg district, Harburg Hills
 Kiekeberg (127 m), Harburg district, Harburg Hills (The Black Hills)
 Blauer Berg (125 m), Uelzen district, Samtgemeinde Suderburg, Lüneburg Heath
 Stemmer Berg (122.8 m), Hanover region
 Müllberg (called Monte Müllo, 121.3 m), city of Hanover
 Lindenberg (121 m), town of Salzgitter
 Spröckelnberg (121 m), Vechta district, Damme Hills
 Loccumer Berg (119 m), Nienburg (Weser) district, Rehburg Hills
 Bökenberg (114 m), Vechta district, Damme Hills
 Geitelder Berg (111 m), city of Brunswick
 Roter Berg (108 m), Osnabrück district, Hüggel
 Fistelberge (107 m), Harburg district, Harburg Hills (The Black Hills (Die Schwarzen Berge))
 Flidderberg (107 m), Harburg district, Harburg Hills, Lohberge
 Kronsberg (106 m), Hanover region
 Wietzer Berg (102 m), Celle district, Südheide
 Otterberg (101 m), Harburg district, southwest of the Harburg Hills
 Nußberg (93 m), city of Brunswick
 Bentheimer Schlossberg (92 m), Grafschaft Bentheim district, outlier of the Teutoburg Forest
 Windmühlenberg (91 m), Emsland district, Lingen Heights
 Poascheberg (89 m), Grafschaft Bentheim district, Niedergrafschaft, near Neuenhaus
 Lindener Berg (87 m), Hanover region
 Giersberg, (83 m), city of Brunswick
 Harzhorn (82 m), Peine district, hill on the eastern perimeter of Duttenstedt
 Silberberg (74 m), Cuxhaven district, Wingst
 Windberg (73 m), Emsland district, Hümmling
 Isterberg (68 m), Grafschaft Bentheim district, south of Nordhorn
 Litberg (65 m), Stade district, Stade Geest
 Seilbahnberg (62.7), Peine district, artificial hill on the eastern edge of Lengede
 Deutscher Olymp (61 m), Cuxhaven district, Wingst
 Weyerberg (51 m), Osterholz district, Worpswede
 Gierenberg (23 m), Oldenburg district, Osenberge
 Kistenberg (23 m), Oldenburg district, Osenberge

See also 
 List of mountains in the Harz
 List of the highest mountains in Germany
 List of the highest mountains in the German states
 List of mountain and hill ranges in Germany

References 

!
Lower Saxony
!
Mount